HMS Malvernian was an Ellerman Lines cargo steamship that was built in 1937. In January 1941 she was converted into an ocean boarding vessel. That July she sank after a German air attack crippled her in the Atlantic Ocean.

This was the second Ellerman Lines ship called Malvernian. The first was built in 1924 as City of Kobe, renamed Malvernian later that year and changed back to City of Kobe in 1927. A mine sank City of Kobe in 1939.

Building
William Gray & Company built Malvernian in its West Hartlepool yard. She was launched on 25 February 1937 and made her sea trials on 3 June, but was not completed until that September.

Malvernian had one screw. Gray's Central Marine Engineering Works built her engines. Her main engine was a steam triple expansion engine. It was supplemented by a Bauer-Wach low-pressure exhaust steam turbine, which ran on exhaust steam from the low pressure cylinder of her piston engine. Via double reduction gearing and a Föttinger fluid coupling the turbine drove the same propeller shaft as her piston engine.

In September 1937 Gray delivered Malvernian to the Ellerman & Papayanni Lines subsidiary of Ellerman Lines.

Second World War
In the Second World War Malvernian at first continued in merchant trade. She sailed in convoys between Gibraltar and Liverpool until May 1940. In July 1940 Malvernian crossed the Atlantic to Montreal, and in August she returned in Convoy HX 62. Later that month she sailed from the Firth of Forth to Hull, and in January and February 1941 she sailed from the Firth of Forth to Oban.

In January 1941 the Admiralty requisitioned Malvernian for conversion into an ocean boarding vessel. She was armed with two 6-inch guns and one anti-aircraft 12-pounder gun. She was commissioned as HMS Malvernian with the pennant number F 102.

Malvernian sent a prize crew aboard, which took August Wriedt to St John's, Newfoundland.

On 1 July 1941 Luftwaffe bombed Malvernian in the North Atlantic, killing four officers and 20 ratings, wounding two officers and setting her afire. Survivors abandoned ship in four lifeboats, but Malvernian remained afloat and adrift until 19 July.

The sloop  searched for survivors, found one lifeboat and rescued its 57 occupants. Kriegsmarine minesweepers found another lifeboat and captured its occupants.

The remaining two lifeboats reached Spain independently. The other, carrying 21 survivors, reached Vigo on 22 July.

References

Bibliography
 
 

 

1937 ships
Cargo ships of the United Kingdom
Maritime incidents in July 1941
Ships built on the River Tees
Ships sunk by German aircraft
Shipwrecks in the Bay of Biscay
Steamships of the United Kingdom
World War II auxiliary ships of the United Kingdom
World War II merchant ships of the United Kingdom
World War II shipwrecks in the Atlantic Ocean